The 2012–13 Eredivisie season was the 53rd season of the Eredivisie ice hockey league, and the first since the disbanding of the North Sea Cup and the reversion to the league's original name.  Six Dutch teams and one Belgian team took part in the season.

When the Leuven Chiefs withdrew from the North Sea Cup at the end of the 2011–2012 season, only one Belgian team, HYC Herentals, remained in the mixed Dutch/Belgian tournament.  It was decided to dispense with the North Sea Cup, reinstate the Dutch Eredivisie regular season, and admit HYC Herentals to the Eredivisie.  Thus in 2012–2013, Herentals was the sole Belgian team to compete for the Dutch national championship (although Herentals still competed for the Belgian Cup).

Also new for the 2012–2013 season was the change of name of the Amsterdam team from "Amsterdam Capitals" the "Amsterdam G's" after finding a title sponsor.

The traditional first game (known as the "Ron Berteling Bowl"), was played on September 30 between the winner of the Dutch Cup and the winner of the Dutch championship from the previous year.   The 7-team, 36-game regular season was followed by a playoff of the top 4 teams (a best-of five semi-final and a best-of-five final).  HYS The Hague was both the top team in the regular season and the Dutch national champions after sweeping both rounds of the playoffs.

Regular season

National Championship Playoffs

References

External links
 Results at official website

Neth
Eredivisie (ice hockey) seasons
Ere
Ere